Radeh may refer to:
 Radeh-ye Madan
 Radeh-ye Sadat
 Radeh-ye Seyhan
 Radeh-ye Taha